The 1962–63 Detroit Red Wings season was the Red Wings' 37th season. They finished in fourth place in the National Hockey League (NHL) with a record of 32 wins, 25 losses, and 13 ties. Detroit defeated the Chicago Black Hawks four games to two in the Semi-Finals, but lost the Stanley Cup Finals to the Toronto Maple Leafs, four games to one.

This season saw right winger Gordie Howe capture the Art Ross Trophy as the league's leading scorer. He potted 38 goals and added 48 assists for 86 points. Howe was also named winner of the Hart Memorial Trophy as the NHL's most valuable player, his sixth overall.

Offseason

Regular season

Final standings

Record vs. opponents

Schedule and results

|- align="center" bgcolor="#CCFFCC" 
|1||W||October 11, 1962||2–1 || align="left"| @ New York Rangers (1962–63) ||1–0–0
|- align="center" 
|2||T||October 13, 1962||0–0 || align="left"| @ Chicago Black Hawks (1962–63) ||1–0–1
|- align="center" bgcolor="#CCFFCC" 
|3||W||October 14, 1962||3–1 || align="left"|  Montreal Canadiens (1962–63) ||2–0–1
|- align="center" bgcolor="#CCFFCC" 
|4||W||October 18, 1962||5–3 || align="left"|  Boston Bruins (1962–63) ||3–0–1
|- align="center" bgcolor="#CCFFCC" 
|5||W||October 21, 1962||3–1 || align="left"|  Chicago Black Hawks (1962–63) ||4–0–1
|- align="center" 
|6||T||October 25, 1962||3–3 || align="left"| @ Boston Bruins (1962–63) ||4–0–2
|- align="center" bgcolor="#CCFFCC" 
|7||W||October 28, 1962||2–0 || align="left"|  Toronto Maple Leafs (1962–63) ||5–0–2
|-

|- align="center" bgcolor="#CCFFCC" 
|8||W||November 1, 1962||4–0 || align="left"|  New York Rangers (1962–63) ||6–0–2
|- align="center" bgcolor="#CCFFCC" 
|9||W||November 3, 1962||7–3 || align="left"| @ Toronto Maple Leafs (1962–63) ||7–0–2
|- align="center" bgcolor="#CCFFCC" 
|10||W||November 4, 1962||3–1 || align="left"|  Chicago Black Hawks (1962–63) ||8–0–2
|- align="center" bgcolor="#FFBBBB"
|11||L||November 8, 1962||1–4 || align="left"| @ Montreal Canadiens (1962–63) ||8–1–2
|- align="center" 
|12||T||November 10, 1962||3–3 || align="left"| @ Boston Bruins (1962–63) ||8–1–3
|- align="center" bgcolor="#CCFFCC" 
|13||W||November 11, 1962||3–2 || align="left"| @ New York Rangers (1962–63) ||9–1–3
|- align="center" bgcolor="#FFBBBB"
|14||L||November 14, 1962||2–4 || align="left"| @ Chicago Black Hawks (1962–63) ||9–2–3
|- align="center" bgcolor="#FFBBBB"
|15||L||November 17, 1962||2–3 || align="left"| @ Toronto Maple Leafs (1962–63) ||9–3–3
|- align="center" bgcolor="#CCFFCC" 
|16||W||November 18, 1962||3–1 || align="left"| @ Boston Bruins (1962–63) ||10–3–3
|- align="center" bgcolor="#FFBBBB"
|17||L||November 22, 1962||0–3 || align="left"|  Montreal Canadiens (1962–63) ||10–4–3
|- align="center" 
|18||T||November 24, 1962||1–1 || align="left"| @ Chicago Black Hawks (1962–63) ||10–4–4
|- align="center" bgcolor="#CCFFCC" 
|19||W||November 25, 1962||3–2 || align="left"|  Chicago Black Hawks (1962–63) ||11–4–4
|- align="center" bgcolor="#FFBBBB"
|20||L||November 29, 1962||0–5 || align="left"|  New York Rangers (1962–63) ||11–5–4
|-

|- align="center" bgcolor="#FFBBBB"
|21||L||December 2, 1962||1–3 || align="left"|  Toronto Maple Leafs (1962–63) ||11–6–4
|- align="center" 
|22||T||December 5, 1962||3–3 || align="left"| @ New York Rangers (1962–63) ||11–6–5
|- align="center" bgcolor="#CCFFCC" 
|23||W||December 6, 1962||5–3 || align="left"|  Boston Bruins (1962–63) ||12–6–5
|- align="center" bgcolor="#FFBBBB"
|24||L||December 8, 1962||1–2 || align="left"| @ Montreal Canadiens (1962–63) ||12–7–5
|- align="center" bgcolor="#CCFFCC" 
|25||W||December 9, 1962||4–3 || align="left"|  Toronto Maple Leafs (1962–63) ||13–7–5
|- align="center" bgcolor="#CCFFCC" 
|26||W||December 13, 1962||3–2 || align="left"|  New York Rangers (1962–63) ||14–7–5
|- align="center" bgcolor="#CCFFCC" 
|27||W||December 15, 1962||3–1 || align="left"|  Chicago Black Hawks (1962–63) ||15–7–5
|- align="center" bgcolor="#FFBBBB"
|28||L||December 16, 1962||2–5 || align="left"| @ New York Rangers (1962–63) ||15–8–5
|- align="center" bgcolor="#FFBBBB"
|29||L||December 20, 1962||3–5 || align="left"|  Boston Bruins (1962–63) ||15–9–5
|- align="center" 
|30||T||December 23, 1962||2–2 || align="left"|  Montreal Canadiens (1962–63) ||15–9–6
|- align="center" bgcolor="#CCFFCC" 
|31||W||December 25, 1962||2–1 || align="left"|  Toronto Maple Leafs (1962–63) ||16–9–6
|- align="center" bgcolor="#FFBBBB"
|32||L||December 26, 1962||4–5 || align="left"| @ Toronto Maple Leafs (1962–63) ||16–10–6
|- align="center" bgcolor="#FFBBBB"
|33||L||December 29, 1962||1–5 || align="left"| @ Montreal Canadiens (1962–63) ||16–11–6
|- align="center" 
|34||T||December 31, 1962||1–1 || align="left"|  New York Rangers (1962–63) ||16–11–7
|-

|- align="center" bgcolor="#FFBBBB"
|35||L||January 1, 1963||2–4 || align="left"| @ Chicago Black Hawks (1962–63) ||16–12–7
|- align="center" 
|36||T||January 6, 1963||5–5 || align="left"|  Boston Bruins (1962–63) ||16–12–8
|- align="center" bgcolor="#CCFFCC" 
|37||W||January 10, 1963||3–2 || align="left"| @ Montreal Canadiens (1962–63) ||17–12–8
|- align="center" bgcolor="#FFBBBB"
|38||L||January 12, 1963||1–2 || align="left"| @ Toronto Maple Leafs (1962–63) ||17–13–8
|- align="center" bgcolor="#CCFFCC" 
|39||W||January 13, 1963||4–2 || align="left"|  New York Rangers (1962–63) ||18–13–8
|- align="center" bgcolor="#CCFFCC" 
|40||W||January 17, 1963||5–3 || align="left"|  Boston Bruins (1962–63) ||19–13–8
|- align="center" bgcolor="#FFBBBB"
|41||L||January 19, 1963||1–5 || align="left"| @ Montreal Canadiens (1962–63) ||19–14–8
|- align="center" 
|42||T||January 20, 1963||2–2 || align="left"|  Toronto Maple Leafs (1962–63) ||19–14–9
|- align="center" 
|43||T||January 24, 1963||1–1 || align="left"|  Montreal Canadiens (1962–63) ||19–14–10
|- align="center" bgcolor="#FFBBBB"
|44||L||January 26, 1963||0–3 || align="left"|  Chicago Black Hawks (1962–63) ||19–15–10
|- align="center" bgcolor="#CCFFCC" 
|45||W||January 27, 1963||5–3 || align="left"| @ Boston Bruins (1962–63) ||20–15–10
|- align="center" bgcolor="#CCFFCC" 
|46||W||January 30, 1963||6–1 || align="left"| @ New York Rangers (1962–63) ||21–15–10
|-

|- align="center" 
|47||T||February 2, 1963||4–4 || align="left"| @ Boston Bruins (1962–63) ||21–15–11
|- align="center" bgcolor="#FFBBBB"
|48||L||February 3, 1963||2–6 || align="left"|  Montreal Canadiens (1962–63) ||21–16–11
|- align="center" 
|49||T||February 6, 1963||3–3 || align="left"| @ Chicago Black Hawks (1962–63) ||21–16–12
|- align="center" 
|50||T||February 7, 1963||3–3 || align="left"|  Boston Bruins (1962–63) ||21–16–13
|- align="center" bgcolor="#CCFFCC" 
|51||W||February 10, 1963||2–1 || align="left"|  Toronto Maple Leafs (1962–63) ||22–16–13
|- align="center" bgcolor="#FFBBBB"
|52||L||February 13, 1963||2–6 || align="left"| @ Toronto Maple Leafs (1962–63) ||22–17–13
|- align="center" bgcolor="#CCFFCC" 
|53||W||February 16, 1963||3–1 || align="left"|  Boston Bruins (1962–63) ||23–17–13
|- align="center" bgcolor="#FFBBBB"
|54||L||February 17, 1963||1–6 || align="left"|  Montreal Canadiens (1962–63) ||23–18–13
|- align="center" bgcolor="#FFBBBB"
|55||L||February 21, 1963||3–5 || align="left"|  Chicago Black Hawks (1962–63) ||23–19–13
|- align="center" bgcolor="#FFBBBB"
|56||L||February 23, 1963||2–3 || align="left"| @ Chicago Black Hawks (1962–63) ||23–20–13
|- align="center" bgcolor="#CCFFCC" 
|57||W||February 24, 1963||3–2 || align="left"| @ New York Rangers (1962–63) ||24–20–13
|- align="center" bgcolor="#FFBBBB"
|58||L||February 26, 1963||3–4 || align="left"|  New York Rangers (1962–63) ||24–21–13
|- align="center" bgcolor="#FFBBBB"
|59||L||February 28, 1963||3–5 || align="left"| @ Boston Bruins (1962–63) ||24–22–13
|-

|- align="center" bgcolor="#CCFFCC" 
|60||W||March 2, 1963||7–1 || align="left"| @ Montreal Canadiens (1962–63) ||25–22–13
|- align="center" bgcolor="#CCFFCC" 
|61||W||March 3, 1963||3–2 || align="left"| @ New York Rangers (1962–63) ||26–22–13
|- align="center" bgcolor="#FFBBBB"
|62||L||March 5, 1963||3–4 || align="left"|  Montreal Canadiens (1962–63) ||26–23–13
|- align="center" bgcolor="#FFBBBB"
|63||L||March 9, 1963||3–5 || align="left"| @ Toronto Maple Leafs (1962–63) ||26–24–13
|- align="center" bgcolor="#CCFFCC" 
|64||W||March 10, 1963||4–3 || align="left"| @ Boston Bruins (1962–63) ||27–24–13
|- align="center" bgcolor="#CCFFCC" 
|65||W||March 14, 1963||9–4 || align="left"|  New York Rangers (1962–63) ||28–24–13
|- align="center" bgcolor="#FFBBBB"
|66||L||March 16, 1963||3–5 || align="left"| @ Montreal Canadiens (1962–63) ||28–25–13
|- align="center" bgcolor="#CCFFCC" 
|67||W||March 17, 1963||4–2 || align="left"|  Chicago Black Hawks (1962–63) ||29–25–13
|- align="center" bgcolor="#CCFFCC" 
|68||W||March 19, 1963||5–1 || align="left"| @ Chicago Black Hawks (1962–63) ||30–25–13
|- align="center" bgcolor="#CCFFCC" 
|69||W||March 23, 1963||2–1 || align="left"| @ Toronto Maple Leafs (1962–63) ||31–25–13
|- align="center" bgcolor="#CCFFCC" 
|70||W||March 24, 1963||3–2 || align="left"|  Toronto Maple Leafs (1962–63) ||32–25–13
|-

Player statistics

Regular season
Scoring

Goaltending

Playoffs
Scoring

Goaltending

Note: GP = Games played; G = Goals; A = Assists; Pts = Points; +/- = Plus-minus PIM = Penalty minutes; PPG = Power-play goals; SHG = Short-handed goals; GWG = Game-winning goals;
      MIN = Minutes played; W = Wins; L = Losses; T = Ties; GA = Goals against; GAA = Goals-against average;  SO = Shutouts;

Playoffs

|- align="center" bgcolor="#FFBBBB"
|1||L||March 26, 1963||4–5 || || align="left" | @ Chicago Black Hawks (1962–63) || 0–1
|- align="center" bgcolor="#FFBBBB"
|2||L||March 28, 1963||2–5 || || align="left" | @ Chicago Black Hawks (1962–63) || 0–2
|- align="center" bgcolor="#CCFFCC"
|3||W||March 31, 1963||4–2 || || align="left" | Chicago Black Hawks (1962–63) || 1–2
|- align="center" bgcolor="#CCFFCC"
|4||W||April 2, 1963||4–1 || || align="left" | Chicago Black Hawks (1962–63) || 2–2
|- align="center" bgcolor="#CCFFCC"
|5||W||April 4, 1963||4–2 || || align="left" | @ Chicago Black Hawks (1962–63) || 3–2
|- align="center" bgcolor="#CCFFCC"
|6||W||April 7, 1963||7–4 || || align="left" | Chicago Black Hawks (1962–63) || 4–2
|-

|- align="center" bgcolor="#FFBBBB"
|1||L||April 9, 1963||2–4 || || align="left" | @ Toronto Maple Leafs (1962–63) || 0–1
|- align="center" bgcolor="#FFBBBB"
|2||L||April 11, 1963||2–4 || || align="left" | @ Toronto Maple Leafs (1962–63) || 0–2
|- align="center" bgcolor="#CCFFCC"
|3||W||April 14, 1963||3–2 || || align="left" | Toronto Maple Leafs (1962–63) || 1–2
|- align="center" bgcolor="#FFBBBB"
|4||L||April 16, 1963||2–4 || || align="left" | Toronto Maple Leafs (1962–63) || 1–3
|- align="center" bgcolor="#FFBBBB"
|5||L||April 18, 1963||1–3 || || align="left" | @ Toronto Maple Leafs (1962–63) || 1–4
|-

Awards and honors
Art Ross Trophy: Gordie Howe
Hart Memorial Trophy: Gordie Howe
Gordie Howe, Right Wing, NHL First Team All-Star
Terry Sawchuk, Goaltender, NHL Second Team All-Star

References
 Red Wings on Hockey Database

Detroit
Detroit
Detroit Red Wings seasons
Detroit Red Wings
Detroit Red Wings